The Polish–Ukrainian border  is the state border between Poland and Ukraine.

History
The Polish–Ukrainian border first came to be, briefly, in the aftermath of the Polish–Ukrainian War in 1919. The Treaty of Warsaw, signed in 1920, divided the disputed territories in Poland's favor along the Zbruch River. A year after the treaty was signed, however, Ukraine lost its independence to the Soviet Union, and its remaining territories were split between Poland and the Ukrainian Soviet Socialist Republic in the Peace of Riga.

During the collectivization of Ukrainian farmland in the first five-year plan and the Holodomor, numerous Soviet citizens of Ukrainian and Polish nationality fled across the border to Poland. Interviews of Soviet refugees by Polish border guards provided the first knowledge of the famine to the West. Poland also sent agents provocateur across the border in order to encourage Ukrainians to revolt against Soviet rule, which was ineffective and only increased Joseph Stalin's paranoia about rebellion and dissidence in the region. 

Following the signing of the Ribbentrop-Molotov agreement and invasion of Poland by the Soviet Union, vast territories in eastern Poland were annexed to the Ukrainian Soviet Socialist Republic. The new border was short-lived, as Nazi Germany invaded the Soviet Union in Operation Barbarossa. The invasion of Ukraine began with the German 1st Panzer Army crossing the border and defeating the Soviet 5th Army in the Battle of Brody. In 1945, following the end of the war and the establishment of the Polish People's Republic, a new border was formed between the Ukrainian SSR and Poland based on the Yalta Agreement. As a result, Poland lost vast territories in Ukraine's favor, including the city of Lviv. 

During the negotiations on the Polish–Soviet border agreement of August 1945, alongside the Polish-Ukrainian section of the border, the Polish side proposal was categorically rejected. Due to this, the Polish side proposed more modest changes, namely to transfer the railway junction in Khyriv (Polish: Chyrów) to Poland, in which two parallel main lines of national importance were connected. At the same time, Rava-Ruska was requested. In this town, located near the Curzon Line, three Polish railway lines and one Ukrainian converged. Polish requests were completely rejected, only managed to slightly shift the border to the east near Przemyśl, Korczowa and Horyniec-Zdrój. The Soviets also agreed to let Medyka to be on the Polish side. The Bieszczady County was also obtained, thanks to the efforts of Stanisław Leszczycki during the negotiations, covering about 300 square km with Halicz and Tarnica peaks.

The dissolution of the Soviet Union into a number of post-Soviet states transformed the Poland-Soviet border into the chain of Poland-Russia, Poland-Lithuania, Poland-Belarus and Poland–Ukraine borders. Poland and Ukraine have confirmed the border on 18 May 1992.  It is the longest of Polish eastern borders.  The border became much more open compared to the Soviet times, when despite being part of the Eastern Bloc, crossing was very difficult. As the border was opened to mass traffic, the number of people crossing the Polish-Ukrainian border begun raising steadily since 1990, stabilizing around 2000s. Approximately 3 million Ukrainians crossed the border in the 1990s, annually. One of the peak numbers was recorded in 2001, with about 12 million people crossing the border.

With Poland joining the European Union in 2004 the border has become one of the external borders of the European Union. It is one of four EU-Ukraine borders, the others being the Hungary–Ukraine border, Romania–Ukraine border and the Slovakia–Ukraine border. As it is an entry point to the Schengen Area, this introduced a visa requirement for Ukrainian citizens entering Poland as of October 2003.  In the period October 2003-September 2004 Polish authorities issued about 620,000 visas to Ukrainians. The visa requirement has not reduced the traffic significantly, as it returned to the prior levels within a year. Another peak has occurred in 2006, when there were almost 20 million border crossings. In 2008 Poland and Ukraine adopted policies on local border traffic (put into effect in 2009). This agreement introduced local border traffic permits, allowing holders to cross the border for up to 90 days per half-year. 2009 saw approximately 12 million border crossings on the Poland–Ukraine border.

On 11 June 2017, the visa policy of the Schengen Area was amended. Ukrainian citizens who hold biometric passports no longer require a visa to enter the Schengen Area (including Poland) for a stay of up to 90 days in a 180-day period.

Characteristics
The Poland–Ukraine border is the most often crossed eastern border of the EU.

Most of the border traffic is generated by Ukrainian citizens. Petty trade and shopping tourism were and still are driving much of the traffic, with migration for labor purposes being another significant factor.

The border is heavily policed, as it is a major smuggling route into the EU, both for goods and for illegal immigration.

Approximately 8 million people live in the border area, roughly equally divided between Poland and Ukraine.

Border crossings
There are numerous border crossings between Poland and Ukraine, in a combination of road, rail, passenger and cargo crossings. As of 2012, the following were active:
 Medyka-Szeginie/Shehyni: road, cargo and passenger crossing; 
Przemyśl-Mostyska II: rail, cargo and passenger crossing; main line Przemyśl-Lviv several hundred meters from road checkpoint
 Dołhobyczów-Uhrynów/Uhryniv: road, 24 hrs.
 Korczowa-Krakovets: road, cargo and passenger crossing; 24 hrs.
 Hrebenne-Rava-Ruska: road, cargo and passenger crossing; and rail passenger crossing;
 Zosin-Uściług/Ustyluh: road, passenger crossing;
 Dorohusk-: both road and rail, cargo and passenger crossings;
 Hrubieszów-Volodymyr-Volynskyi: rail, cargo and passenger crossing;
 Krościenko-: road
 Werchrata-Rava-Ruska: rail, cargo crossing
 Budomierz-Hruszew/Hruszów

See also

References

 
Borders of Poland
Borders of Ukraine
European Union external borders
International borders
Lublin Voivodeship
Podkarpackie Voivodeship